Johnny Guitar is a 1954 film directed by Nicholas Ray.

Johnny Guitar may also refer to:

Songs 
"Johnny Guitar" (song), the title song from the film by Peggy Lee
"Johnny Guitar", a song from the album Queens of Noise by The Runaways
"Johnny Guitar", a song from the album Backspacer by Pearl Jam

People 
Johnny "Guitar" Watson (1935 – 1996), an American blues and funk guitarist and singer
Johnny Byrne (1939–1999), guitarist for rock group Rory Storm and the Hurricanes; used the stage name Johnny Guitar